Groenendaelia is a monotypic moth genus in the family Cossidae. Its only species, Groenendaelia kinabaluensis, is found in Sundaland, including Borneo. The habitat consists of montane forests and lowland areas.

The forewings are brown, divided from the striated bone grey apical area by a concave margin.

References

Natural History Museum Lepidoptera generic names catalog

Cossinae
Moths described in 1933
Moths of Asia
Monotypic moth genera